KDFI (channel 27), branded on-air as Fox 4 More or More 27, is a television station licensed to Dallas, Texas, United States, broadcasting MyNetworkTV to the Dallas–Fort Worth metroplex. It is owned and operated by Fox Television Stations alongside Fox outlet KDFW (channel 4, also licensed to Dallas). Both stations share studios on North Griffin Street in downtown Dallas, while KDFI's transmitter is located in Cedar Hill, Texas.

History

Prior history of UHF channel 27 in Dallas–Fort Worth
The UHF channel 27 allocation in the Dallas–Fort Worth market was initially applied for broadcasting use by Overmyer Communications, who filed a license application in 1966. Veteran radio broadcaster Gordon McLendon (who purchased the station for his son Barton) was granted a license for channel 27 in 1967 with a construction permit being issued in 1968. McLendon planned to launch a television station under the callsign KLIF-TV, which was to be based out of the building that also housed upstart radio station KNUS (98.7 FM, now KLUV) at 2110 Commerce; resources would also be pooled between the television and radio stations as KNUS planned to convert to an all-news format. However, the station never formally signed on and by 1972, the KLIF-TV license was deleted by the Federal Communications Commission (FCC). (The KLIF calls were later used for a radio station broadcasting at 570 AM.)

As an independent station
The current television station on UHF channel 27 traces its history to 1973, when Englewood, Colorado-based Liberty STV – a subsidiary of cable television provider Tele-Communications Inc. (TCI), which formed the company as part of a trust to avoid violating FCC cross-ownership rules prohibiting common ownership of television stations and cable television systems in markets where TCI owned cable systems – filed an application with the FCC for a license and construction permit to operate a commercial television station on channel 27 that would operate as a part-time subscription television service. A month before the FCC Broadcast Bureau granted Liberty a construction permit in February 1980, the name of the company changed to Liberty Television, Inc.

The station first signed on the air on January 26, 1981, as KTWS-TV.  The station's original studio facilities were located at 433 Regal Row in northwest Dallas. Originally operating as an independent station, KDFI initially maintained a mixed information and entertainment schedule, running low-cost syndicated and barter programs (consisting of cartoons, sitcoms and drama series, religious programs, westerns and some public domain movies) from 7:00 a.m. until 7:00 p.m. weekdays, a mix of public affairs, outdoor sports and children's programs on Saturday mornings, and religious programs on Sunday mornings.

It also aired business news programming from the Financial News Network each weekday from 11:00 a.m. to 2:00 p.m. and 3:30 to 4:00 p.m., as well as network programs from ABC, NBC and CBS that were respectively preempted by WFAA (channel 8), KXAS-TV (channel 5) and KDFW-TV (channel 4). The signal was scrambled weekdays from 7:00 p.m. until its 2:00 a.m. sign-off and weekends from 12:00 p.m. to 2:00 a.m. to transmit Preview, a subscription service that offered a mix of theatrically released feature films and required a special decoder box in order to receive the programs. (In September 1982, Preview was replaced by Video Entertainment Unlimited (VEU), after the latter moved its affiliation from fellow independent KNBN-TV [channel 33, now CW affiliate KDAF].)

On October 25, 1983, Liberty Television sold the station to Richardson-based Dallas Media Investors Corporation (owned by former KDFW station manager John A. McKay and American Stock Exchange chairman Arthur Levin) for $12 million. The station briefly went dark after the sale was finalized on June 27, 1984; the following month, the station returned to the air and its call letters were changed to the current KDFI-TV on August 16, 1984. KDFI dropped VEU programming in 1985, and became a general entertainment station for the entire broadcast day. It began running low-budget syndicated programs, older cartoons, and B-movies. The station continued to run pre-empted network shows as well, and had been able to balance its books.

In February 1994, Argyle Television – then-owner of KDFW-TV – took over management responsibilities for KDFI under a local marketing agreement with Dallas Media Investors. The agreement – which resulted in KDFI integrating its operations into KDFW's studio facilities on North Griffin Street in downtown Dallas – allowed KDFW to provide advertising, promotional and master control services for KDFI, while Dallas Media Investors retained responsibilities over channel 27's programming and production services. Under KDFW/Argyle's oversight, KDFI also began to make additional improvements to its programming lineup, acquiring partial local rights to certain syndicated programs carried by KDFW (mostly talk shows).

Additional changes to channel 27's program lineup came as a result of a four-way affiliation shakeup spurred by an agreement between then-Fox network parent News Corporation and New World Communications. Under that deal, on July 2, 1995, KDFW – which had been affiliated with CBS since that station signed on in December 1949 – replaced KDAF (which Fox sold to Renaissance Broadcasting in order to affiliate with KDFW under the agreement and took over the market's WB affiliation from KXTX-TV, which carried the network under a temporary agreement) and the CBS affiliation shifting over to KTVT. In addition to carrying a mix of recent and classic sitcoms and drama series, some religious programs and a heavy schedule of talk shows in both the daytime and evening hours on weekdays, KDFI also acquired the local rights to several syndicated programs that KTVT was not able to retain because of CBS' network-dominated schedule (including a few animated series to fill certain morning timeslots, first-run and off-network syndicated scripted programs and syndicated movie packages).

On July 17, 1996, News Corporation — which separated most of its entertainment holdings into 21st Century Fox in July 2013 — announced that it would acquire New World Communications in an all-stock transaction worth $2.48 billion; the merger deal also included rights to the LMA with KDFI. The purchase of the New World stations and transfer of the LMA between KDFW and KDFI by News Corporation was finalized on January 22, 1997, folding KDFW and the operations of KDFI into the company's Fox Television Stations subsidiary.

In September 1997, KDFI acquired the local rights to the Fox Kids programming block, which remained with KDAF following Fox's sale of that station to Renaissance Broadcasting. Like other New World stations affected by the affiliation agreement, KDFW declined to carry the Fox Kids weekday and Saturday blocks upon joining Fox, choosing instead to air an expanded local morning newscast and first-run syndicated programs in place of the weekday blocks, and a local Saturday morning newscast, a mix of first-run and off-network syndicated children's programs, infomercials and local real estate programs on weekend mornings. With the acquisition of Fox Kids, KDFI dropped the few syndicated children's programs that remained in its inventory. As a result of decisions to turn those lineups' timeslots back over to Fox Kids' carrier stations, Fox discontinued its weekday morning children's block in September 1999, and its weekday afternoon block on December 31, 2001. The Saturday morning lineup, meanwhile, was contracted out to 4Kids Entertainment and relaunched as FoxBox (later renamed 4Kids TV) on September 14, 2002. Fox ended its network-supplied children's programming on December 28, 2008, amid a dispute over monetary compensation and affiliate clearance for the block's time-lease agreement. (4KidsTV was replaced on January 3, 2009, with the paid programming block Weekend Marketplace until Fox brought back children's programming with the launch of Xploration Station on September 13, 2014.)

Channel 27's programming lineup during this period had become a more traditional format for an independent station, with a mix of classic off-network sitcoms, syndicated talk and reality shows, movies as well as children's programs sourced from Fox Kids. In December 1999, four months after the FCC began permitting television station duopolies, Fox Television Stations purchased KDFI from Dallas Media Investors for $6.2 million, creating a legal duopoly with KDFW. The sale received FCC approval on February 18, 2000. The acquisition resulted in the KDFW/KDFI combination becoming the first television duopoly in the Metroplex and the first duopoly that Fox operated as a whole (predating the group's acquisition of Chris-Craft/United Television's UPN-affiliated stations on August 12 of that year).

MyNetworkTV affiliation

On January 24, 2006, UPN parent company CBS Corporation and WB network parent Warner Bros. Entertainment announced that they would dissolve the two networks to create The CW, a joint network venture that initially featured a mix of original first-run series and programs that originated on The WB and UPN. On that date, The CW also signed a ten-year affiliation agreement with Tribune Broadcasting, under which sixteen of the group's eighteen WB-affiliated stations – including KDAF, which Tribune acquired as part of its July 1996 acquisition of Renaissance Broadcasting – would serve as the network's charter stations. In response to having its UPN affiliates be passed over for affiliations with The CW, Fox Television Stations stripped all network branding from and ceased promoting the network's programming on its UPN-affiliated stations. However, it is very unlikely that KDFI would have been selected as The CW's Metroplex area affiliate in any event. Representatives for The CW were on record as preferring to align with UPN and The WB's "strongest" affiliates; KDAF had been ahead of KDFI in the ratings since shortly after channel 33 became the market's original Fox owned-and-operated station in October 1986.

Nearly one month after the CW launch announcement, on February 22, 2006, Fox Television Stations and fellow News Corporation subsidiary Twentieth Television announced the launch of MyNetworkTV, a network created primarily to serve as a network programming option for UPN and WB stations that were left out of The CW's affiliation deals. Of the eleven stations that Fox announced would serve as the nuclei for the new network, KDFI was the only one to have been an independent station prior to joining MyNetworkTV, whereas the service's other News Corporation-owned charter stations – all but one of which was involved in the BHC Communications purchase six years earlier – had been affiliates of UPN.

KDFI is also the largest MyNetworkTV-affiliated station, in terms of market size, to not have been formerly affiliated with either UPN or The WB prior to joining the network (which would convert into a "syndication service" in September 2009). The station began branding itself on-air as "My 27" shortly after the announcement, reflecting the new network's branding conventions. A temporary logo using the circular 27 symbol and the word "my" (in place of the call letters) was created. The KDFI website accordingly changed its slogan to "Shows I Like Are on My27". On July 7, 2006, KDFI officially changed its logo to MyNetworkTV's four-square logo style. KDFI officially joined MyNetworkTV upon that network's launch on September 5, 2006, two weeks prior to the cessation of UPN's operations on September 17.

On August 28, 2017, KDFI changed its on-air branding to "Fox 4 More", aligning its brand with that of KDFW; the adoption of the "Fox 4" brand extension mirrored similar rebrandings of Fox Television Stations' MyNetworkTV O&Os or independent stations in other markets where the group has a duopoly (such as "KTVU Plus," adopted from KTVU in San Francisco, "Fox 5 Plus," adopted from WTTG in Washington, D.C., "Fox 9 Plus," adopted from KMSP-TV in Minneapolis–Saint Paul, "Fox 10 Xtra," adopted from KSAZ-TV in Phoenix, and "Fox 13 Plus", adopted from KCPQ in Seattle) to increase their brand association with their parent Fox O&Os. As of the Fall 2019 television season, KDFI alternately brands itself as "More 27".

Programming
KDFI carries the entire MyNetworkTV programming schedule; from the service's launch in September 2006, KDFI aired MyNetworkTV programming from its "live" feed each weeknight from 7:00 to 9:00 p.m. This lasted until August 2017, when KDFI began airing the service's programming on a one-hour delay from 8:00 to 10:00 p.m. (later pushed further to 9:00 to 11:00 p.m. in April 2018 and then 10:00 to midnight in September 2019). Syndicated programs broadcast by KDFI include off-network repeats of The Big Bang Theory, America Says, Dateline, Chicago P.D. and Modern Family, as well as repeats of first-run syndicated programs seen earlier on KDFW, such as Extra, The Real, The Good Dish and Judge Judy. There are also first-run syndicated programs that are only seen on KDFI, including Dish Nation, Divorce Court, Caught in Providence, Family Feud and The 700 Club. Occasionally as time permits, KDFI may air Fox network programs whenever KDFW is unable to in the event of extended breaking news or severe weather coverage.

Sports programming
Due to its Fox ownership, KDFI once broadcast Texas Rangers and Dallas Stars games that were not carried regionally by Fox Sports Southwest. Broadcasts of both teams' games moved to KTXA (channel 21) in 2010. KDFI began airing a number of Stars and Rangers games in network's high definition in early 2008.

The station also aired two Dallas Cowboys Thursday Night Football games that also aired on the NFL Network during the 2007–2008 NFL season, along with the high definition feed for those games. The games against the Green Bay Packers on November 29 and Carolina Panthers on December 22, 2007, were the highest-rated telecasts in the history of KDFI.

Newscasts
When channel 27 (as KTWS-TV) signed on in January 1981, the station aired some limited local news programming in the form of five-minute news capsules that aired weekdays at the top of the hour between 4:00 and 6:00 p.m., anchored by former WFAA anchor Bob Gooding. After KDFW assumed management responsibilities for KDFI under a local marketing agreement between Argyle Television and Dallas Media Investors Corporation in January 1994, KDFI began airing tape-delayed rebroadcasts of KDFW's 10:00 p.m. newscast each weeknight at 10:30 p.m. In addition, during the summer and fall of 1994, KDFW also produced a daily 30-minute wrap-up of the proceedings in the O. J. Simpson murder case for KDFI, which aired in place of the 10:00 p.m. news rebroadcast. The news rebroadcasts were discontinued in September 1994. In the early 2000s, KDFW produced a 15-minute newscast after Stars and Rangers games aired on KDFI known as the Fox News Wrap.

For the remainder of the LMA's existence as well as the first 15 years under Fox ownership, KDFI did not broadcast any local news programming, either rebroadcasts or those produced specifically for channel 27 by KDFW. This ended on April 2, 2018, when KDFI began airing a rebroadcast of KDFW's 6:00 p.m. newscasts each weeknight at 7:00 p.m. – replacing first-run syndicated programs that had aired during the 7:00 half-hour – following the footsteps of other Fox-owned MyNetworkTV stations that have de-emphasized the service's branding during the 2017 calendar year, which have opted to air local newscasts produced by its parent Fox O&O after timeshifting the MyNetworkTV schedule to a later evening slot.

In February 2022, KDFI began simulcasting programming from Fox Weather. This programming airs from 10 to 11 a.m. on weekdays, and from 5 to 7 a.m. on Saturdays on the main channel. KDFI also offers a full simulcast of Fox Weather on their 6th subchannel.

Technical information

Subchannels
The station's digital signal is multiplexed:

KDFI launched digital subchannel 27.2 with programming from Bounce TV on March 30, 2012. KDFI added Movies! on digital channel 27.2 on May 27, 2013, with Bounce being moved to a new 27.3 subchannel. Bounce TV later moved to KUVN-DT 23.2. Buzzr was added to 27.3 on June 1, 2015.

Analog-to-digital conversion
KDFI shut down its analog signal, over UHF channel 27, on June 12, 2009, as part of the federally mandated transition from analog to digital television. The station's digital signal remained on its pre-transition UHF channel 36, using PSIP to display KDFI's virtual channel as 27 on digital television receivers.

References

KLIF-TV Channel 27 designation in 1972. Detailed Texas EBS Operational Plan.

External links

DFW Radio/TV History
FCC History Cards for KDFI

Fox Television Stations
MyNetworkTV affiliates
Movies! affiliates
Buzzr affiliates
TheGrio affiliates
Television stations in the Dallas–Fort Worth metroplex
Television channels and stations established in 1981
New World Communications television stations
1981 establishments in Texas
National Hockey League over-the-air television broadcasters